Carminati may refer to:

People
Alain Carminati (born 1966), French rugby union player
Massimo Carminati (born 1958), Italian mobster and terrorist
Tullio Carminati (1894–1971), Italian actor

Places
Palazzo Carminati, palazzo in Milan
Villa Carminati-Ferrario, Monza, building in Monza

Italian-language surnames